The second season of The Masked Singer Malaysia premiered on 28 January 2022 on Astro Warna (CH127). The final episode aired on 1 April 2022.

Host and panelist

The second season presented by the same host, Dato' AC Mizal. The panelist consisting of nine popular local celebrities who played role as permanent jury.

Permanent jury members

Guest jury

Format
The second season follows the same format as per first season. However, at the end of each episode, all juries are required to give one name before the celebrity's identity is revealed. Each jury will be given one mark for each correct guess and the jury with the highest mark will be awarded with "The Best Guess Jury" in the final episode.

Contestants and Elimination

Episodes

Week 1 (28 January 2022)

Week 2 (04 February 2022)

Week 3 (11 February 2022)

Week 4 (18 February 2022)

Week 5 (25 February 2022)

Week 6 (04 March 2022)

Week 7 (11 March 2022)

Week 8 (18 March 2022)

Week 9 (25 March 2022)

Week 10 (01 April 2022)

See also
The Masked Singer Malaysia
The Masked Singer Malaysia (season 1)
Masked Singer
Astro Warna
Akademi Fantasia
I Can See Your Voice Malaysia

References

External links
Astro's Official Website
Gempak's Official Website

Masked Singer Malaysia, The
Musical game shows
Malaysian reality television series
Malaysian television series based on South Korean television series
2020s Malaysian television series